The brown boobook (Ninox scutulata), also known as the brown hawk-owl, is an owl which is a resident breeder in south Asia from India, Sri Lanka, Bangladesh and Nepal east to western Indonesia and south China.

This species is a part of the larger grouping of owls known as typical owls, Strigidae, which contains most species of owl. The other grouping is the barn owls, Tytonidae.

Taxonomy
The brown boobook was formally described in 1822 by Stamford Raffles from a specimen collected in Sumatra under the binomial name Strix scutulata. The specific epithet is from Latin scutulatus  meaning "diamond-shaped". The brown boobook is now placed with the other boobooks in the genus Ninox that was introduced by the English naturalist Brian Houghton Hodgson in 1837.

Nine subspecies are recognised:

 N. s. lugubris (Tickell, 1833) – north, northeast, central India and Nepal
 N. s. burmanica Hume, 1876 – northeast India to south China, Indochina and Thailand
 N. s. hirsuta (Temminck, 1824) – south India and Sri Lanka
 N. s. isolata Baker, ECS, 1926 – Car Nicobar
 N. s. rexpimenti Abdulali, 1979 – Great Nicobar Island
 N. s. scutulata (Raffles, 1822) – Malay Peninsula, Riau Archipelago, Sumatra and Bangka Island
 N. s. javanensis Stresemann, 1928 – west Java
 N. s. borneensis (Bonaparte, 1850) – Borneo and north Natuna Islands
 N. s. palawanensis Ripley & Rabor, 1962 – Palawan (west Philippines)

Description
It has a hawk-like shape due to its long tail and lack of a distinct facial disk. The upperparts are dark brown, with a barred tail. The underparts are whitish with reddish-brown streaking, although the subspecies found in the Andaman Islands has dark brown underparts. The eyes are large and yellow. Sexes are similar.

This species is very nocturnal but it can often be located by the small birds that mob it while it is roosting in a tree. It feeds mainly on large insects, frogs, lizards, small birds, and mice. The call is a repeated low soft, musical oo-uk ...ooo-uk... which may be heard at dusk and dawn.  This owl is quite common in towns and cities like Colombo, Sri Lanka, as well as suburban areas close to buildings.

Distribution and habitat
The brown boobook is a resident breeder in most of tropical south Asia from the Middle East to south China. Its habitat is well-wooded country and forest. It lays three to five eggs in a tree hole.

There are two records of the brown boobook in the western hemisphere: an individual photographed on St. Paul Island, Alaska, on August 27, 2007, and a dead owl found on Kiska Island in 2008.

Gallery

References

Further reading

External links

Photos, audio and video of brown hawk-owl from Cornell Lab of Ornithology's Macaulay Library

brown boobook
Birds of South Asia
Birds of Southeast Asia
brown boobook